Ruskeasuo (Brunakärr in Swedish, verbatim "Brown swamp") is a neighbourhood of  Helsinki (Helsingfors in Swedish), about 3 kilometres north of the city center.

With a population of 2670 (year 2005) Ruskeasuo is a rather quiet residential area. Buildings by Mannerheimintie are typically 6-8 floors high from 1950s. Between Mannerheimintie and Central Park, low-rise buildings are dominant.

The equestrian dressage and eventing competitions for the 1952 Summer Olympics took place at their sports hall.

References
1952 Summer Olympics official report. p. 58.

 
Venues of the 1952 Summer Olympics
Olympic equestrian venues